Action is an album by Oscar Peterson, the first volume of his Exclusively for My Friends series. Originally released by MPS Records, it was later released by Prestige Records as Easy Walker.

Reception
An audiophile reviewer commented that the recording balance was inconsistent and that the bass sound on the first two tracks was "fat, tuneless woof, as if the instrument were stuffed with a large, very fluffy bath towel".

The AllMusic review by Ken Dryden awarded the album 4 stars writing "Action represents some of Peterson's earliest work for Brunner-Schwer; these sessions were recorded before an invited audience in the studio, with the pianist's working trio of Ray Brown and Ed Thigpen. The group seems extremely relaxed and inspired by the small group of loyal fans, with a brisk waltz treatment of "At Long Last Love" and an extended workout of fellow pianist Billy Taylor's ballad "Easy Walker" starting things off with a flourish. Their approach to "Tin Tin Deo" is remarkably subtle, while Peterson is at his most lyrical during a pair of Gershwin selections, "I've Got a Crush on You" and "A Foggy Day." The influence of Art Tatum is apparent with Peterson's darting runs in "Like Someone in Love.".

The Penguin Guide to Jazz included the album in its suggested "Core Collection".

Track listing
 "At Long Last Love" (Cole Porter) – 4:56 (Recorded April 24, 1964)
 "Easy Walker" (Billy Taylor) – 9:36 (Recorded April 24, 1964)
 "Tin Tin Deo" (Gil Fuller, Chano Pozo) – 5:34 (Recorded April 24, 1964)
 "I've Got a Crush on You" (George Gershwin, Ira Gershwin) – 5:15 (Recorded March 27, 1963)
 "A Foggy Day" (G. Gershwin, I. Gershwin) – 4:35 (Recorded March 27, 1963)
 "Like Someone in Love" (Johnny Burke, Jimmy Van Heusen) – 11:18 (Recorded March 27, 1963)

Personnel
 Oscar Peterson – piano
 Ray Brown – double bass
 Ed Thigpen – drums

References

1968 albums
Oscar Peterson albums
MPS Records albums
Prestige Records albums